Derrick Sullivan (10 August 1930 – 31 August 1983) was a Wales international football player. A defender, he played his club football for Cardiff City.

Club career
After coming through the ranks at Cardiff he made his debut in April 1948 against Newcastle United. Sullivan spent more than a decade at Cardiff and played in nearly all outfield positions for the club. He eventually moved to Exeter City and then Newport County before moving into non-league football with Hereford United and Ebbw Vale.

International career
He was part of the Wales squad for the 1958 FIFA World Cup in Sweden.

References

External links

 

1930 births
1983 deaths
Footballers from Newport, Wales
Association football defenders
Welsh footballers
Wales international footballers
1958 FIFA World Cup players
Cardiff City F.C. players
Exeter City F.C. players
Newport County A.F.C. players
Hereford United F.C. players
Welsh people of Irish descent
English Football League players
Ebbw Vale F.C. players